The discography of Natacha Atlas, a Belgian world music singer, consists of nine studio albums, one live album, four compilation albums, 18 singles, and one video album. She debuted in the early 1990s, appearing on albums recorded by ¡Loca! and Jah Wobble's Invaders of the Heart. In 1993, Atlas joined ethnic electronica group Transglobal Underground as the lead singer and belly dancer.

Atlas released her solo debut studio album Diaspora in March 1995. The album is a hybrid of genres, combining trance, techno and traditional Arabic music. It reached number 123 on the United Kingdom albums chart and produced three singles. Halim, her second studio album, was released in May 1997. It featured collaborations with duo Sawt El Atlas and Egyptian composer Essam Rashad. In the UK, the album peaked at number 128. Atlas' third album, Gedida, followed in March 1999. It reached number 19 on the French albums chart and produced her first top-twenty single, "Mon Amie La Rose". Atlas released her fourth studio album Ayeshteni in May 2001. It peaked at number 36 in France and number 46 in her native Belgium.

After a two-year hiatus, Atlas released her sixth studio album Something Dangerous in May 2003. Featuring collaborations with British composer Jocelyn Pook and Irish singer Sinéad O'Connor, the album reached number 13 on the United States Billboard World Music Albums chart. The Best of Natacha Atlas, a compilation album, and its companion video album followed in 2005. 
Released in April 2006, Atlas' seventh studio album Mish Maoul reached number 12 on the US World Music Albums chart. Her eighth studio album Ana Hina was released in May 2008. It was recorded with the Mazeeka Ensemble and primarily features acoustic cover versions of songs originally performed by Arabic singers. Atlas' ninth studio album Mounqaliba was released in September 2010; it was preceded by the single "River Man".

Albums

Studio albums

Live albums

Compilation albums

Singles

As a main artist

As a featured artist

Videography

Video albums

Music videos

See also
List of Natacha Atlas collaborations
Transglobal Underground discography

References

External links
Official website

Discographies of Belgian artists
Discography
Folk music discographies